Las Cabezas de San Juan is a village and municipality located in the Bajo Guadalquivir comarca, in Seville province, Andalusia, Spain. According to the 2009 census (INE), the village has a population of 16.464 inhabitants. Famous people from Las Cabezas de San Juan include World Cup-winning footballer Carlos Marchena.

References

External links 
Official website of Las Cabezas de San Juan

Municipalities of the Province of Seville